Kramers' opacity law describes the opacity of a medium in terms of the ambient density and temperature, assuming that the opacity is dominated by bound-free absorption (the absorption of light during ionization of a bound electron) or free-free absorption (the absorption of light when scattering a free ion, also called bremsstrahlung).  It is often used to model radiative transfer, particularly in stellar atmospheres.  The relation is named after the Dutch physicist Hendrik Kramers, who first derived the form in 1923.

The general functional form of the opacity law is

where  is the resulting average opacity,  is the density and  the temperature of the medium.  Often the overall opacity is inferred from observations, and this form of the relation describes how changes in the density or temperature will affect the opacity.

Calculation

The specific forms for bound-free and free-free are

Bound-free:

Free-free:

Electron-scattering:

The  is an additional correction factor, typically having a value between 1 and 100. The opacity depends on the number density of electrons and ions in the medium, described by the fractional abundance (by mass) of elements heavier than hydrogen , and the fractional abundance (by mass) of hydrogen .

References

Bibliography

Scattering, absorption and radiative transfer (optics)